U.S. Route 10S may refer to:

U.S. Route 10S (Minnesota), a former U.S. Highway in Minnesota
U.S. Route 10S (Montana), a former U.S. Highway in Montana

S
10S
10S